Jonathan Eysseric and Sergiy Stakhovsky were the defending champions but chose not to defend their title.

Radu Albot and Jose Statham won the title after defeating Jeevan Nedunchezhiyan and Christopher Rungkat 7–5, 6–3 in the final.

Seeds

Draw

References
 Main Draw

Ningbo Challenger - Doubles